Jordan competed at the 2004 Summer Olympics in Athens, Greece, from 13 to 29 August 2004.

Athletics 

Jordanian athletes have so far achieved qualifying standards in the following athletics events (up to a maximum of 3 athletes in each event at the 'A' Standard, and 1 at the 'B' Standard).

Men

Women

Equestrian

Show jumping

Swimming 

Men

Women

Table tennis

Jordan has qualified one table tennis player in the women's singles through a tripartite invitation.

Taekwondo

Jordan has qualified two taekwondo jin for the following events.

See also
 Jordan at the 2002 Asian Games
 Jordan at the 2004 Summer Paralympics

References

External links
Official Report of the XXVIII Olympiad
Jordan Olympic Committee 

Nations at the 2004 Summer Olympics
2004
2004 in Jordanian sport